Gangxia station is a station of Line 1 and Line 10 of the Shenzhen Metro. Line 1 platforms opened on 28 December 2004 and Line 10 platforms opened on 18 August 2020. It is located underground at the junction of Fuhua Road and Caituan Road in Futian District, Shenzhen, China. It mainly serves the nearby residential buildings.

Station layout

Exits

References

Railway stations in Guangdong
Shenzhen Metro stations
Futian District
Railway stations in China opened in 2004
Railway stations located underground in China